Kashf al-ghumma fi ma'rifat al-a'imma is a book written by Ali b. Isa al-Irbili, a shi'a scholar, about the excellence of Ahl al-Bayt of Prophet Muhammad. It is written in 13th century.

References

13th-century books
Shia literature